Tate Fogleman (born March 8, 2000) is an American professional stock car racing driver. He last competed part-time in the NASCAR Camping World Truck Series, driving the No. 30 Toyota Tundra for On Point Motorsports and the No. 26 Chevrolet Silverado for Rackley WAR.

Racing career

NASCAR Truck Series
Fogleman made his NASCAR debut in the Camping World Truck Series in 2018, driving the No. 20 Chevrolet Silverado for Young's Motorsports. His first race was at Gateway, where he finished 27th after starting 15th due to a crash with Justin Fontaine. He returned to the team at Kentucky, where he started 16th and finished 28th due to suspension problems.

After not racing in the series in 2019, Fogleman returned to Young's for the full 2020 Truck Series season, driving the No. 02.

For 2021, Fogleman stayed with Young's and switched to the No. 12, running another full season. He scored his first career win at Talladega by sending John Hunter Nemechek sideways and beating Tyler Hill by 0.052 seconds before both trucks crashed into the inner wall.

On November 30, 2021, On Point Motorsports announced that Fogleman would race full-time for the team in 2022, driving the No. 30 Toyota Tundra.

CARS Super Late Model Tour
Fogleman first started competing in the Late Model Tour in 2016, where he ran 8 of the 10 races and came in 9th in points standings. He returned to the series in 2017, where he ran 8 of the 13 races and also managed to lead 45 laps while finishing 5th in points standings.

Personal life
He is the son of Jay Fogleman, who also has competed in both NASCAR and CARS Tour as well.

Fogleman is a business major at High Point University. He previously attended Durham Academy.

Motorsports career results

NASCAR
(key) (Bold – Pole position awarded by qualifying time. Italics – Pole position earned by points standings or practice time. * – Most laps led.)

Camping World Truck Series

 Season still in progress
 Ineligible for series points

References

External links
 

Living people
2000 births
NASCAR drivers
Racing drivers from North Carolina
CARS Tour drivers
High Point University alumni
Sportspeople from Durham, North Carolina